Oenogenes congrualis is a species of snout moth in the genus Oenogenes. It is found in Australia.

References

Moths described in 1866
Endotrichini